This is a list of notable events in music that took place in the year 1954.

Specific locations
1954 in British music
1954 in Norwegian music

Specific genres
1954 in country music
1954 in jazz

Events
January 14 – First documented use of the abbreviated term "Rock 'n' Roll" to promote Alan Freed's Rock 'n' Roll Jubillee, held at St. Nicholas Arena in New York City. Previously the genre term was just called "Rock and Roll".
February 1 – Johnny "Guitar" Watson records "Space Guitar" pioneering reverb and feedback techniques on guitar.
March 12 – Arnold Schoenberg's opera Moses und Aron has its first performance in Hamburg (it is given a staged première on June 6 in Zürich).
March 15 – The Chords record "Sh-Boom" for Atlantic Records' Cat subsidiary.
March 25 – At the 26th Academy Awards, Frank Sinatra wins the Academy Award for Best Supporting Actor for his role in From Here to Eternity, resuscitating his singing career in the process. At the same ceremony, Bing Crosby is nominated for Best Actor for his role in The Country Girl.
April – Fender Stratocaster electric guitar first produced in California.
April 12 – Bill Haley & His Comets record "Rock Around the Clock" in New York City for Decca Records.
May 5 – The seventeenth Maggio Musicale Fiorentino opens with a performance of Gaspare Spontini's last opera, Agnese di Hohenstaufen, and continues until 20 June, featuring operas by Weber, Adriano Lualdi, Puccini, and Tchaikovsky, as well as the world premiere of Valentino Bucchi's Il contrabasso.
May 20 – "Rock Around the Clock" is released as the B-side of "Thirteen Women (and Only One Man in Town)". The song is only a moderate success (US # 23 on May 29, 1954, for only one week ; UK # 17, in December 1954) until it is featured in the film Blackboard Jungle the following year.
July 5 – Elvis Presley has his first commercial recording session at Sun Studios in Memphis, Tennessee. He sings "That's All Right (Mama)" and "Blue Moon of Kentucky", released as his first single on July 19 naming the performers as Elvis Presley, Scotty and Bill. The songs were originally sung by Arthur Crudup in 1946 and Bill Monroe and the Blue Grass Boys in 1947 respectively.
October 16 – Elvis Presley makes his first radio broadcast, on a show in Shreveport, Louisiana, called Louisiana Hayride.
Fall – A cover version of Big Joe Turner's "Shake, Rattle and Roll" by Bill Haley & His Comets becomes the first internationally popular rock and roll recording.
Record companies deliver 7-inch 45 rpm record singles to radio stations instead of 78s.
Lyric Opera of Chicago is founded.
Les Paul commissions Ampex to build the first eight track tape recorder, at his own expense.
The Drifters form.
The Isley Brothers make their first recordings, featuring only the three eldest brothers, O'Kelly Jr., Rudolph and Ronald.
The Newport Jazz Festival is established by George Wein.
São Paulo State Symphony Orchestra is founded.

Albums released
 Al Haig Trio (Esoteric) – Al Haig
 Bing: A Musical Autobiography – Bing Crosby
 Blue Haze – Miles Davis
 The Chordettes Sing Your Requests – The Chordettes
 Clap Yo' Hands – The Four Lads
 Crew Cut Capers – The Crew-Cuts
 Dinah Jams – Dinah Washington
 Favorite Songs – The Ames Brothers
 Grand Jacques – Jacques Brel
 Guy Mitchell Sings – Guy Mitchell
 Irving Berlin Favorites – Eddie Fisher
 Irving Berlin's White Christmas – Rosemary Clooney
 It Must Be True – The Ames Brothers
Just Patti – Patti Page
 Louis Armstrong and the Mills Brothers – Louis Armstrong & The Mills Brothers
 Louis Armstrong Plays W.C. Handy – Louis Armstrong and His All Stars
 The Man That Got Away – Georgia Gibbs
 Meet The Mills Brothers – The Mills Brothers
 Mr. Rhythm – Frankie Laine
 My Heart's In The Highland – Jo Stafford
 A Night at Birdland Vol. 1 – The Art Blakey Quintet
 A Night at Birdland Vol. 2 – The Art Blakey Quintet
 Old Masters – Bing Crosby
Patti Page Sings for Romance – Patti Page
Patti's Songs – Patti Page
 RCA Thesaurus – John Serry, Sr.
 Red Garters – Rosemary Clooney
 Rock with Bill Haley and the Comets – Bill Haley & His Comets
 Selections from Irving Berlin's White Christmas – Bing Crosby, Danny Kaye, Trudy Stevens, Peggy Lee
So Many Memories – Patti Page
 Some Fine Old Chestnuts – Bing Crosby
 Something Cool – June Christy
 Song Souvenirs – Patti Page
 Songs for Young Lovers – Frank Sinatra
 Songs in a Mellow Mood – Ella Fitzgerald
 Souvenir Album – The Mills Brothers
 Swing Easy! – Frank Sinatra
 Till I Waltz Again with You – Teresa Brewer
 The Tin Angel – Odetta & Larry
 Toshiko at Mocambo – Toshiko Akiyoshi
 Toshiko's Piano – Toshiko Akiyoshi
 Young at Heart – Doris Day & Frank Sinatra

Biggest hit singles
The following singles achieved the highest chart positions in the set of charts available for 1954.

US No. 1 hit singles
These singles reached the top of US Billboard magazine's charts in 1954.

Top hits on record

A–J
"Am I a Toy or a Treasure" – Kay Starr
"Answer Me, My Love" – Nat King Cole
"Back Where I Belong" – Frankie Laine and Jo Stafford
"Baubles, Bangles & Beads", recorded by
Georgia Gibbs
Peggy Lee
"The Christmas Song" – Nat King Cole (a new version; original release was in 1946)
"Cross Over The Bridge" – Patti Page
"Darling, Je Vous Aime Beaucoup" – Nat King Cole
"Earth Angel" – The Penguins (also in 1955)
"Ebb Tide" – Roy Hamilton
"Goodnight, Sweetheart, Goodnight" – The McGuire Sisters
"Hearts Of Stone" – The Fontane Sisters
"I Cried" – Patti Page
"I Need You Now" – Eddie Fisher
"I Speak To The Stars" – Doris Day
"If I Give My Heart to You", recorded by
Doris Day
Denise Lor
"If You Love Me (Really Love Me)" – Kay Starr
"In the Chapel in the Moonlight" – Kitty Kallen
"In the Beginning" – Frankie Laine
"In The Mood" – Glenn Miller
"In the Still of the Night" – The Five Satins
"Johnny Guitar" – Peggy Lee

L–S
"Let Me Go, Lover" – Joan Weber
"Little Things Mean a Lot" – Kitty Kallen
"Make Love to Me" – Jo Stafford
"The Man That Got Away" – Georgia Gibbs
"Melancholy Baby" – Georgia Gibbs
"Melody of Love" – Frank Sinatra and Ray Anthony
"Mr. Sandman" – Chordettes
"Muskrat Ramble" – Matys Brothers
"My Sin" – Georgia Gibbs
"Mystery Train" – Elvis Presley
"Oh! My Pa-Pa" – Eddie Fisher
"Opus One" – The Mills Brothers
"Out Of Nowhere" – Frankie Laine
"Papa Loves Mambo" – Perry Como
"Rain, Rain, Rain" – Frankie Laine and The Four Lads
"Say Hey", recorded by
Ray Anthony
The Treniers
"Secret Love" – Doris Day
"Sh-Boom", recorded by
The Crew-Cuts
The Chords
Stan Freberg (as a parody of The Chords' version).
"Sincerely" – McGuire Sisters (also in 1955)
"Smile" – Nat King Cole
"Someone to Watch Over Me" – Frank Sinatra
"Such a Night", recorded by
Johnnie Ray
Clyde McPhatter and The Drifters
"Sway" – Dean Martin

T–Y
"Teach Me Tonight" – The DeCastro Sisters
"Tenderly" – Nat King Cole
"Thank You for Calling" – Jo Stafford
"That's All Right Mama" – Elvis Presley
"Tweedlee Dee" – LaVern Baker (also in 1955)
"Wanted" – Perry Como
"What a Dream" – Patti Page
"When The World Was Young" – Felicia Sanders
"Whither Thou Goest" – Les Paul and Mary Ford
"You'll Never Walk Alone" – Roy Hamilton
"You're Nobody till Somebody Loves You" – The Mills Brothers

Top R&B and country hits on record
"Bimbo" – Jim Reeves
"Goodnight Sweetheart Goodnight" – Spaniels
'Slowly" – Webb Pierce
"Hearts Of Stone" – Jewels
"I'm Your Hoochie Coochie Man" – Muddy Waters
"Mambo Baby" – Ruth Brown
"Oh What A Dream" – Ruth Brown
"Oop Shoop" – Shirley Gunther and The Queens
"Shake A Hand" – Faye Adams
"Shake Rattle And Roll" – Big Joe Turner
"I Don't Hurt Anymore" – Hank Snow
"The Things That I Used To Do" – Guitar Slim
"Tweedlee Dee" – LaVern Baker
"Work With Me, Annie" – Hank Ballard & the Midnighters

Published popular music
 "All of You" words and music: Cole Porter
 "Annie Had a Baby" w.m. Henry Glover & Lois Mann
 "A Blossom Fell" w.m. Howard Barnes, Harold Cornelius & Dominic John
 "Cara Mia" w.m. Tulio Trapani & Lee Lange
 "Cherry Pink And Apple Blossom White" w. (Eng) Mack David (Fr) Jacques Larue m. Louiguy
 "Count Your Blessings (Instead of Sheep)" w.m. Irving Berlin
 "Cross Over The Bridge" w.m. Bennie Benjamin & George David Weiss
 "Earth Angel" w.m. Jesse Belvin, Curtis Williams & Gaynel Hodge
 "Ev'ry Day of My Life" w.m.Al Jacobs and Jimmie Crane.
 "The Finger Of Suspicion Points At You" w.m. Paul Mann & Al Lewis
 "From The Vine Came The Grape" w.m. Leonard Whitcup & Paul Cunningham
 "Gilly Gilly Ossenfeffer Katzenellen Bogen by the Sea" w.m. Al Hoffman & Dick Manning
 "Hearts Of Stone" w. Eddy Ray m. Rudy Jackson
 "Hernando's Hideaway" w.m. Richard Adler & Jerry Ross
 "He's A Tramp" Sonny Burke, Peggy Lee
 "Hey There" w.m. Richard Adler & Jerry Ross
 "The High and the Mighty" w. Ned Washington m. Dimitri Tiomkin
 "Honeycomb" w.m. Bob Merrill
 "I Can't Tell A Waltz From A Tango" Al Hoffman, Dick Manning
 "I Could Be Happy With You" w.m. Sandy Wilson
 "I Don't Hurt Anymore" w. Jack Rollins m. Don Robertson
 "I Got A Woman" w.m. Ray Charles & Renald Richard
 "I Left My Heart In San Francisco" w. Douglas Cross m. George Cory
 "If I Give My Heart to You" w.m. Jimmy Brewster, Jimmie Crane & Al Jacobs
 "I'll Walk With God" w. Paul Francis Webster m. Nicholas Brodszky
 "I'm Not At All In Love" w.m. Richard Adler & Jerry Ross. Introduced by Janis Paige in the musical The Pajama Game.
 "In Other Words" (aka "Fly Me To The Moon") w.m. Bart Howard
 "In Paris and in Love" w. Leo Robin m. Sigmund Romberg. Introduced by Jeanmaire and David Atkinson in the musical The Girl in the Pink Tights
 "Let Me Go, Lover!" w.m. Jenny Lou Carson & Al Hill
 "The Little Shoemaker" w.(Eng) John Turner & Geoffrey Parsons (Fr) Avril Lamarque m. Rudi Revil
 "Mambo Italiano" w.m. Bob Merrill
 "Mister Sandman" w.m. Pat Ballard
 "Misty" w. Johnny Burke m. Erroll Garner
 "My Son, My Son" w. Bob Howard m. Melville Farley & Eddie Calvert
 "The Naughty Lady of Shady Lane" w.m. Sid Tepper & Roy C. Bennett
 "Only You (and You Alone)" w.m. Buck Ram & Ande Rand
 "Open Up Your Heart (And Let the Sunshine In)" w.m. Stuart Hamblen
 "Papa Loves Mambo" w.m. Al Hoffman, Dick Manning & Bix Reichner
 "Pledging My Love" w.m. Ferdinand Washington & Don Robey
 "The Poor People of Paris" w.(Eng) Jack Lawrence (Fr) Rene Rouzaud m. Marguerite Monnot "La Goulante du Pauvre Jean"
 "Release Me" w.m. Eddie Miller & W. S. Stevenson
 "River of No Return" w. Ken Darby m. Lionel Newman from the film River of No Return.
 "Shake, Rattle And Roll" w.m. Charles Calhoun
 "Sh-Boom" w.m. James Keyes, Claude & Carl Feaster, Floyd F. McRae & William Edwards
 "Sincerely" w.m. Harvey Fuqua & Alan Freed
 "Sisters" w.m. Irving Berlin
 "Skokiaan" w. Tom Glazer m. August Musarurwa
 "Smile" w. John Turner & Geoffrey Parsons m. Charles Chaplin
 "Steam Heat" w.m. Richard Adler & Jerry Ross
 "There Once Was a Man" w. m. Richard Adler & Jerry Ross. Introduced by John Raitt and Janis Paige in the musical The Pajama Game
 "This Ole House" w.m. Stuart Hamblen
 "Three Coins In The Fountain" w. Sammy Cahn m. Jule Styne
 "Tweedle Dee" w.m. Winfield Scott
 "What a Dream" w.m. Chuck Willis
 "Whither Thou Goest" w.m. Guy Singer
 "Wonderful, Wonderful Day" w. Johnny Mercer m. Gene De Paul from the film Seven Brides for Seven Brothers
 "Work With Me, Annie" w.m. Hank Ballard
 "Young And Foolish" w. Arnold B. Horwitt m. Albert Hague from the 1955 musical Plain and Fancy

Other notable songs
"Le Déserteur" – Boris Vian
Tierra bendita y divina –  a traditional Spanish language Christian hymn is published.
"V Put" – Vasili Solovyov-Sedoy and Mikhail Dudin

Classical music

Premieres

 1 Recording for the Austrian Radio. The Symphony received its two first concert performances in 1955 under Alois Melichar in Graz and Jan Koetsier in Munich.

Compositions

Arnold Bax – Autumn Legend for Cor Anglais and Strings
Luciano Berio – Nones for orchestra
Boris Blacher – Viola Concerto
Havergal Brian – Symphony No. 10
Carlos Chávez – Symphony No. 3
George Crumb – String Quartet
Mario Davidovsky – Concertino for Percussion and Strings
George Enescu – Chamber Symphony in E major, Op. 33
Ross Lee Finney – Piano Trio No. 2
Gerald Finzi – Cello Concerto
André Fleury – Messe pour la fête de tous les saints
Armstrong Gibbs – Dale and Fell, suite for strings
Howard Hanson – Sinfonia sacra (Symphony No. 5)
Andrew Imbrie – Violin Concerto
Alemdar Karamanov – Symphony No. 1
Wojciech Kilar –
The Bird for voice and piano
Sonata for horn and piano
Ernst Krenek
Symphony "Pallas Athene", Op. 137
Violin Concerto No. 2, Op. 140
György Kurtág - Mouvement for viola and orchestra
György Ligeti – Métamorphoses nocturnes (String Quartet No. 1)
Witold Lutosławski
Concerto for Orchestra
Dance Preludes, for clarinet and piano
Bohuslav Martinů – Sonata for Piano, H. 350
Darius Milhaud – West Point Suite
Per Nørgård - Metamorfosi
Walter Piston – Symphony No. 5
Edmund Rubbra – Symphony No. 6
John Serry Sr. –
Allegro – m. Joseph Haydn, arranged for accordion quartet
The Golden Wedding – m. Jean Gabriel-Marie, arranged for accordion quartet
Tango of Love – arranged for accordion quartet
Roger Sessions – Idyll of Theocritus
Robert Simpson – String Quartet No. 3
Karlheinz Stockhausen – Studie II
Igor Stravinsky – In memoriam Dylan Thomas
Virgil Thomson – Concerto for Flute, Strings, Harp and Percussion
Ernst Toch – String Quartet No. 13
Henri Tomasi – Horn Concerto
Eduard Tubin – Symphony No. 6
Edgard Varèse – Déserts
Ralph Vaughan Williams
Sonata in A Minor for Violin and Piano
Tuba Concerto
Heitor Villa-Lobos – String Quartet No. 15
Stefan Wolpe
Symphony for 24 Instruments
Piece for Oboe, Cello, Percussion and Piano, "Oboe Quartet"
Iannis Xenakis - Metastaseis
Bernd Alois Zimmermann - Nobody knows the trouble I see Concert for trumpet and chamber orchestra

Opera
Jack Beeson – Hello, Out There
 Benjamin Britten – The Turn of the Screw
 Valentino Bucchi – Il contrabasso (Maggio Musicale Fiorentino, 20 June)
 Aaron Copland – The Tender Land
 Paul Hindemith – Neues vom Tage, revised version of 1929 opera
 Bohuslav Martinů – Mirandolina
 Jerome Moross – The Golden Apple
 William Walton – Troilus and Cressida

Jazz

Musical theater
 After the Ball (Music, Lyrics and Book: Noël Coward) London production opened at the Globe Theatre on June 10 and ran for 188 performances
 The Boy Friend Broadway production opened at the Royale Theatre on September 30 and ran for 485 performances
 By the Beautiful Sea (Music: Arthur Schwartz Lyrics: Dorothy Fields) Broadway production opened at the Majestic Theatre on April 8 and transferred to the Imperial Theatre on October 2 for a total run of 268 performances. Starring Shirley Booth
 Can-Can London production opened at the Coliseum on October 14 and ran for 394 performances
 The Duenna ( Music: Julian Slade Lyrics & Book: Dorothy Reynolds) London production opened at the Westminster Theatre on July 28 and ran for 134 performances
 Fanny Broadway production opened at the Majestic Theatre on November 4 and transferred to the Belasco Theatre on December 4, 1956, for a total run of 888 performances
 The Girl in Pink Tights Broadway production opened at the Mark Hellinger Theatre on March 5 and ran for 115 performances
 The Golden Apple Broadway production opened at the Alvin Theatre on April 20 and ran for 125 performances
 Happy Holiday (Music: George Posford Lyrics & Book: Eric Maschwitz and Arnold Ridley) London production opened at the Palace Theatre on December 22 and ran for 31 performances
 House of Flowers Broadway production opened at the Alvin Theatre on December 30 and ran for 165 performances
 On Your Toes Broadway revival opened at the 46th Street Theatre on October 11 and ran for 64 performances
 The Pajama Game (Richard Adler and Jerry Ross) — Broadway production opened at the St. James Theatre on May 13 and transferred to the Shubert Theatre on November 24, 1956, for a total run of 1063 performances
 Pal Joey (Music: Richard Rodgers Lyrics: Lorenz Hart Book: John O'Hara) London production opened at Princes Theatre on August 4 and ran for 245 performances
Peter Pan Broadway production opened at the Winter Garden Theatre on October 20 and ran for 152 performances
 Salad Days (Music: Julian Slade Lyrics & Book: Dorothy Reynolds and Julian Slade) London production opened at the Vaudeville Theatre on August 5 and ran for 2283 performances
 You'll Be Lucky London revue opened at the Adelphi Theatre on February 25. Starring Sally Barnes and Lauri Lupino Lane.
 Zuleika — premiere in Cambridge, England

Musical films

 Athena, starring Jane Powell, Debbie Reynolds, Edmund Purdom and Vic Damone
 Brigadoon
 Carmen Jones
 Casanova's Big Night starring Bob Hope
 Chandraharam, starring N.T. Rama Rao
 Deep in My Heart, starring José Ferrer
 French Cancan, starring Jean Gabin and María Félix
 The French Line, starring Jane Russell
 Living It Up, starring Dean Martin, Jerry Lewis and Janet Leigh
 Lucky Me, starring Doris Day, Robert Cummings and Phil Silvers
 Mayurpankh, directed by and starring Kishore Sahu
 New Faces
 Red Garters, starring Rosemary Clooney, Jack Carson and Guy Mitchell
 Rhapsody, starring Elizabeth Taylor
 River of No Return, starring Marilyn Monroe
 Rose Marie, starring Ann Blyth and Howard Keel
 Seven Brides for Seven Brothers, starring Jane Powell, Howard Keel and Julie Newmar.
 A Star Is Born
 The Student Prince, starring Ann Blyth and Edmund Purdom with Mario Lanza dubbing for Purdom.
 There's No Business Like Show Business
 Top Banana (film), starring Phil Silvers
 White Christmas, starring Bing Crosby, Danny Kaye, Rosemary Clooney and Vera Ellen

Musical television
Babes in Toyland
 Lady in the Dark (starring Ann Sothern)

Births

January–April
January 1 – Richard Edson, American drummer
January 2 – Glenn Goins, American R&B/funk guitarist and singer (Parliament-Funkadelic) (died 1978)
January 4 – Eugene Chadbourne, American guitarist and songwriter
January 7 – José María Vitier, Cuban pianist and composer
January 16 – Cheryl Bentyne, vocalist (The Manhattan Transfer)
January 19 – Katey Sagal, American singer-songwriter and actress
January 25 – Richard Finch, funk composer (K.C. and the Sunshine Band)
January 29 – Richard Manitoba, singer
February 1 – Chuck Dukowski, American singer-songwriter and bass player (Black Flag, Würm, Black Face and October Faction)
February 10 – Carita Holmström, pianist, singer and songwriter
February 18 – John Travolta, actor, singer and dancer
February 19 – Jimmy Pursey, vocalist (Sham 69)
February 20 – Jon Brant, bass guitar player (Cheap Trick)
February 27 –
JoAnn Falletta, orchestral conductor
Neal Schon, rock musician (Journey) Santana
March 10 – Tina Charles, disco singer
March 15 – Jon King, post-punk singer-songwriter (Gang Of Four)
March 16 – Nancy Wilson, rock singer-songwriter (Heart)
March 27 – Wally Stocker, rock guitarist (The Babys)
March 31 – Tony Brock, rock drummer (The Babys)
April 1 – Knut Værnes, Norwegian guitarist
April 2 – Susumu Hirasawa, singer-songwriter, guitarist and keyboardist (P-MODEL)
April 4 – Michel Camilo, pianist
April 5 – Peter Case, singer-songwriter and guitarist,
April 13 – Jimmy Destri, rock keyboard player and songwriter (Blondie)
April 17 – Michael Sembello, singer, instrumentalist and songwriter
April 28 – Michael Daugherty, composer

May–December
May 1 – Ray Parker Jr., guitarist, songwriter and record producer
May 2 –
Angela Bofill, singer songwriter
Elliot Goldenthal, composer
May 10 – Barrington Pheloung, screen composer (died 2019)
May 11 – Judith Weir, composer, Master of the Queens Music
May 18 – Reinhold Heil, composer
May 20 – Jimmie Henderson (Black Oak Arkansas)
May 21 – Marc Ribot, session guitarist and composer
May 31 – Vicki Sue Robinson, US disco singer (died 2000)
June 3 – Dan Hill, singer-songwriter
June 8 – Greg Ginn, punk guitarist (Black Flag)
June 13 – Robert Donaldson (Bo Donaldson & the Heywoods)
June 15 – Terri Gibbs, country singer
June 20 – Michael Anthony (Van Halen)
July 7 –
Pam Bricker, American singer and guitarist (died 2005)
Ron Jones, composer
July 10 – Neil Tennant, British singer-songwriter and record producer (Pet Shop Boys)
July 18 –
Tobias Picker, American composer
Ricky Skaggs, American singer-songwriter, mandolin player and producer (New South)
August 11 – Joe Jackson, singer, songwriter and composer
August 17 – Eric Johnson, guitarist, songwriter and record producer
August 25 – Elvis Costello, singer-songwriter
September 14 – Barry Cowsill, drummer (died 2005)
September 17 – Joël-François Durand, French composer
September 21 – Phil Taylor, English heavy metal drummer (Motörhead) (died 2015)
September 28 – George Lynch, heavy metal guitarist (Dokken)
September 30 –
Basia, singer
Patrice Rushen, African-American singer
October 3 – Stevie Ray Vaughan, guitarist, singer and songwriter (died 1990)
October 3 – Dawayne Bailey, guitarist, singer and songwriter (alias Bob Seger-Chicago)
October 9 – James Fearnley (The Pogues)
October 10 –
Susan Frykberg, electroacoustic composer and sound artist
David Lee Roth (Van Halen)
October 12 – Michael Roe, guitarist, lead singer of The 77s
November 3 – Adam Ant, singer
November 4 – Chris Difford, singer, songwriter and record producer (Squeeze)
November 9 – Dennis Stratton (Iron Maiden)
November 10 – Mario Cipollina (Huey Lewis and the News)
November 14 –
Anson Funderburgh, American guitarist and bandleader
Yanni, pianist, keyboardist and composer
November 15 – Randy Thomas, American singer-songwriter, guitarist and producer (Sweet Comfort Band and Allies)
November 16 – Donald Runnicles, conductor
November 18 – John Parr, singer
November 23 – Bruce Hornsby, pianist, singer and songwriter (Grateful Dead)
December 11 – Jermaine Jackson, singer (The Jackson 5)
December 25 –
Robin Campbell (UB40)
Annie Lennox, singer
date unknown – Gérard Buquet, tubist, conductor and composer

Deaths
January 9 – Eugen Coca, violinist and composer, 60
January 11 – Oscar Straus, Viennese operetta composer, 83
March 3 – Noel Gay, English songwriter, 55
March 11 – Frankie Newton, American trumpeter, 48
March 19 – Walter Braunfels, pianist and composer, 71
March 27 – Carl T. Fischer, composer and jazz pianist, 41
April 5 – Claude Delvincourt, pianist and composer, 66
April 8 – Edwin Grasse, violinist and composer, 69
April 9 – Philip Greeley Clapp, pianist and composer, 65
April 11 – Paul Specht, violinist and bandleader, 59
April 14 – Lil Green, blues singer, 34 (pneumonia)
April 17 – Torsten Ralf, operatic tenor, 53
May 1 – Arthur Johnston, songwriter, 56
May 19 – Charles Ives, composer, 79
May 20 – Linda Lee Thomas, socialite and wife of Cole Porter, 70
May 31 – Pedro Elías Gutiérrez, musician and composer, 84
June 17 – Danny Cedrone, session guitarist (soloist on "Rock Around the Clock"), 33 (fell downstairs)
July 7 – Idabelle Smith Firestone, American composer and songwriter, 79
July 16 – Lucien Muratore, operatic tenor and actor, 77
August 8 – Phil Ohman, film composer and pianist, 57
August 13 – Demetrius Constantine Dounis, violin teacher
August 17 – Billy Murray, singer, 77
August 24 – Fred Rose, songwriter, music publisher, 56
October 24 – Pepito Arriola, pianist, 57
October 27 – Franco Alfano, composer and pianist, 79
November 11 – J. Rosamond Johnson, composer and singer
November 29 – Dink Johnson, jazz musician, 56
November 30 – Wilhelm Furtwängler, conductor and composer, 68
December 14
Papa Celestin, jazz musician, 70
Sergei Protopopov, Russian composer and music theorist, 61
December 25
Johnny Ace, American rhythm and blues singer, 25 (shooting accident)
Rosario Scalero, violinist, teacher and composer, 84
date unknown – Per Reidarson, composer and music critic

References

 
20th century in music
Music by year